Rudolf Brunner (26 November 1827 – 11 March 1894) was a Swiss politician and President of the Swiss National Council (1871/1872).

External links 
 
 

Members of the National Council (Switzerland)
Presidents of the National Council (Switzerland)
1827 births
1894 deaths